"Daddy Lessons" is a song recorded by the American singer Beyoncé for her sixth studio album, Lemonade (2016). The song was written and produced by Wynter Gordon, Beyoncé, Kevin Cossom and Alex Delicata. The song's music video is part of a one-hour film with the same title as its parent album, originally aired on HBO. A remix featuring Dixie Chicks was released as a promotional single on November 2, 2016.

Background and composition 
Written and produced by Wynter Gordon, Beyoncé, Kevin Cossom and Alex Delicata, it is the singer's first Americana-country music record. In an interview with Billboard, Kevin Cossom talked about the creative process and the song's meaning:"Working with Wynter Gordon was awesome, [...] because she's just so free and everything's so organic. We were in my condo in Miami, [...] I called over a good friend of mine, Alex Delicata, who is also co-producer and writer. He played the guitar, we harmonies, stomping and clapping, and that was the vibe. [...] I just honestly let her vibe out. It was obviously a female record. When it comes to that, I like to listen as far as the perspective of a woman or how they're feeling. It's pretty much daddy lessons. A girl that grew up tough. Her father was hard on her, didn't want nobody to take advantage of her. Definitely one of those situations. It painted a country picture in our minds. It didn't take the hip-hop element to make it tough, which I think is very cool especially for Beyonce. And it goes with her being from Texas. Her vibe to it just makes sense for how it all came together."At the end of the interview Cossom comments on the inclusion of the country genre in the singer's musical background, stating:"Lemonade is very worldly in comparison to the last project, which was way more urban. This project is worldly and the record "Daddy Lessons" just happened to work. Once a formula works, people want to use that formula again until it doesn't work anymore but what's awesome about Beyonce is she doesn't have to play by the rules:  she creates them."

Critical reception 
There was controversy on if "Daddy Lessons" constituted a country track.

Naming "Daddy Lessons" the best song on Lemonade, Carl Wilson for Slate writes that the track is "certainly the best country pastiche ever heard on a contemporary R&B album, and it could be the country song of the year, period. It's reminiscent in theme and tone of classic Nashville mama/papa ballads by the likes of Dolly Parton or Tom T. Hall but, of course, from an utterly distinct vantage point."

In 2016, The Recording Academy's country music committee rejected the inclusion of "Daddy Lessons."

Recognition and accolades 
"Daddy Lessons" and its performance at the CMA Awards won "Collaboration of the Year" and "Most Unforgettable Moment of the Year", respectively, at the 2017 Golden Boot Awards. Slate placed "Daddy Lessons" in its top 31 songs of 2016 list, while NPR considered the track the 63rd best song of 2016.

Impact and controversy

Textual allusion to the relationship with her father 
According to some publications, the song may be a reference to the singer's turbulent relationship with her father, Mathew Knowles. Michelle Kim of The Fader reported that "Beyoncé also confronts the parallels between her husband and her father, who was found to have also cheated on her mother during their 31-year marriage" but which "nevertheless, Lemonade doesn't chronicle all the twists and turns that Beyoncé and her father's relationship has undergone. While Beyoncé owes a lot to her persistent and sometimes even controlling father, die hard Beyoncé fans know that it's always been complicated". Joi-Marie McKenzie of ABC News writes that the singer " got introspective, sharing what she learned about men from her father" and she also has "shut down rumors that her father had never met her daughter, Blue Ivy, in the song's corresponding music video. Home footage showed the two happily playing".

During an academic lecture at Texas Southern University, Mathew Knowles, interviewed by Sirius XM's Mark Thompson, clarified leaked rumors following the release of the song, saying:"I can only speak of being a proud father. I think Beyoncé pushed the envelope of creativity on this HBO special. [...] The media would have you think I've never spoken to Beyoncé. But as you can see in the documentary, that me and Blue Ivy was playing. I'm a grown-up, I'm 64 years old, it doesn't bother me what people say about me. I know the facts. I know how many times I see my kids, and they speak to me so that's not important to me."

Black cowboy culture 
The song has been credited as starting a trend of "pop stars toying with American West and Southern aesthetics," as well as setting the precedent for "The Yeehaw Agenda," the trend of reclaiming black cowboy culture through music and fashion.

Reactions to the performance at the Country Music Association Awards. 
Beyoncé's performance of "Daddy Lessons" at the 50th Annual Country Music Association Awards along with the Dixie Chicks sparked controversy among country music fans. As Alex Abad-Santos of Vox described the backlash: "Some of their sentiment was due to Beyoncé's liberal-leaning politics, some of it was rooted in her perceived lack of country cred, and some of it was downright racist." Although some country artists spoke out against having the singer perform at the awards ceremony, including Travis Tritt who said "As I see it, country music has appealed to millions for many years. We can stand on our own and don't need pop artists on our awards shows", many artists complimented the pop star's inclusion in the musical lineup, including Chris Stapleton, Kenny Chesney, Kelsea Ballerini, Maren Morris, Cassadee Pope, and Brad Paisley.

Commercial performance
After the release of Lemonade, "Daddy Lessons" debuted and peaked on the Billboard Hot 100 chart at number 41 and Hot R&B/Hip-Hop songs chart at number 26. In overseas charts, the song entered in digital charts in top 10 in the Netherlands and Sweden. The song also reached the top 40 in the UK, and was certified silver by British Phonographic Industry (BPI) in February 2021.

Remix
On November 2, 2016, Beyoncé released a remix of "Daddy Lessons" featuring the American country band The Chicks free of purchase on her website. On November 20, 2016, "Daddy Lessons" was released as a promotional single on iTunes and multiple streaming services. The song samples The Chicks' song "Long Time Gone".

Cover versions
"Daddy Lessons" was added in the setlist of the American country band Dixie Chicks during their DCX MMXVI World Tour. On April 30, 2016, the song was covered for the first time at Manchester Arena in Manchester, England and remained in their setlist throughout the remainder of the European leg of the tour in addition to the North American leg of the tour. Billboard describes the performance as "faithful" to the original song.

In 2019, the song was covered in the episode "Chapter Fifty-Six: The Dark Secret of Harvest House" from the third season of the television series Riverdale, performed by Camila Mendes.

Live performances
"Daddy Lessons" is part of the set list of Beyonce's The Formation World Tour with the first performance taking place in Miami at the Marlins Park on April 27, 2016. Beyoncé and Dixie Chicks also performed the song with excerpts from the band's "Long Time Gone" at the 2016 Country Music Association Awards on November 2, 2016. A studio version was released after the performance.

Charts

Certifications

References

2016 songs
2016 singles
Beyoncé songs
The Chicks songs
Songs written by Beyoncé
Songs written by Darrell Scott
Songs written by Wynter Gordon
Song recordings produced by Beyoncé
Song recordings produced by Lloyd Maines
Songs written by Kevin Cossom
Songs about Texas
Songs about fathers